RSNA may refer to:
Radiological Society of North America
Robust Security Network Association